Cult Movies 2 is a 1983 book by Danny Peary, a follow-up to his 1980 book Cult Movies. Just like its predecessor it consists of a series of essays regarding what Peary described as the most representative examples of the cult film phenomenon. This book covered fifty films not among the hundred in the first volume.

Content
The films are presented in alphabetical order, with each chapter featuring a story synopsis for the covered title, Peary’s response to the film, production and release details, and a brief selection of contemporary critical reviews. The book features one guest contributor, Henry Blinder, who wrote the essay on Willy Wonka & the Chocolate Factory. A sequel to this book came out in 1988: Cult Movies 3.

Publication history
Certain chapters from Cult Movies 2 were republished in 2014 as a thematically connected e-book, bringing together essays about cult movies from certain genres.

The films 

 Altered States (1980)
 Der Amerikanische Freund (The American Friend, 1977)
 Barbarella (1968)
 Basket Case (1982)
 Beat the Devil (1953)
 Bedazzled (1968)
 The Big Heat (1953)
 Blood Feast (1963)
 Blood Money (1933)
 A Boy and His Dog (1975)
 Breathless (À Bout de Souffle) (1960)
 Bride of Frankenstein (1935)
 Children of Paradise (Les Enfants du Paradis) (1945)
 A Clockwork Orange (1971)
 Cutter's Way (1981)
 Dark Star (1974)
 Daughters of Darkness (1971)
 The First Nudie Musical (1976)
 Godzilla (1954)
 The Great Texas Dynamite Chase (1976)
 High School Confidential (1958)
 His Girl Friday (1940)
 Last Tango in Paris (1972)
 The Man Who Fell to Earth (1976)
 Marnie (1964)
 Massacre at Central High (1976)
 Mommie Dearest (1981)
 Monty Python and the Holy Grail (1975)
 Morgan - A Suitable Case for Treatment (1966)
 Ms. 45 (1981)
 My Darling Clementine (1946)
 Night of the Demon (1957)
 Nightmare Alley (1947)
 The Parallax View (1974)
 Phantom of the Paradise (1974)
 Picnic at Hanging Rock (1975)
 Pretty Baby (1978)
 Quadrophenia (1979)
 Salt of the Earth (1954)
 The Seventh Seal (1957)
 Some Like it Hot (1959)
 Sullivan's Travels (1942)
 Taxi Driver (1976)
 To Be or Not to Be (1942)
 Vanishing Point (1971) White Heat (1949)
 The Wicker Man (1973)
 Willy Wonka & the Chocolate Factory (1971)
 Wuthering Heights (1939)
 Zardoz'' (1974)

References

External links
 Interview with Danny Peary about the  Cult Movies books.
 Podcast discussion about Danny Peary's Cult Movies, with an interview with Peary himself.

1983 non-fiction books
Books about film
Film and video fandom
Cult following